Chloroacetamide (2-chloroacetamide) is a chlorinated organic compound with the molecular formula ClCH2CONH2.  Chloroacetamide is a colorless solid although older samples appear yellow. It has a characteristic odor and is readily soluble in water.

Production
Chloroacetamide is produced by ammonolysis of esters of chloroacetic acid:
ClCH2CO2CH3  +  NH3   →   ClCH2C(O)NH2  +  CH3OH

Uses
Chloroacetamide has been used as an herbicide, preservative. and in the manufacturing of pharmaceuticals.

Hazards 
Chloroacetamide is toxic, irritates eyes and skin, and may cause an allergic reaction. It is suspected of reproductive toxicity and teratogenicity.

See also 
 Acetamide
 Iodoacetamide

References 

Organochlorides
Acetamides
Herbicides
Preservatives